The women's sanda (as Sanshou) 60 kg competition at the 2010 Asian Games in Guangzhou, China was held from 13 November to 17 November at the Nansha Gymnasium.

A total of twelve competitors from twelve different countries competed in this event, limited to fighters whose body weight was less than 60 kilograms.

Khadijeh Azadpour from Iran won the gold medal after beating Wangkhem Sandhyarani Devi of India in gold medal bout 2–0. The bronze medal was shared by Wu Tzu-yi from Chinese Taipei and Paloy Barckkham of Laos. Azadpour became the first Iranian female to win an Asian Games gold medal in an individual event.

Athletes from Afghanistan (Suraya Salahshuor), Vietnam (Tân Thị Ly), Nepal (Jharana Gurung) and Indonesia (Moria Manalu) shared the fifth place altogether.

Schedule
All times are China Standard Time (UTC+08:00)

Results
Legend
AV — Absolute victory

References

External links
Official website

Women's sanda 60 kg